A. Venkatapura  is a village in the southern state of Karnataka, India. It is located in the Koratagere taluk of Tumkur district in Karnataka.

See also
 Tumkur
 Districts of Karnataka

References

External links
  A. Venkatapura on government of India website.

Villages in Tumkur district